This page lists all described species of the spider family Euctenizidae accepted by the World Spider Catalog :

Apomastus

Apomastus Bond & Opell, 2002
 A. kristenae Bond, 2004 — USA
 A. schlingeri Bond & Opell, 2002 (type) — USA

Aptostichus

Aptostichus Simon, 1891
 A. aguacaliente Bond, 2012 — USA
 A. angelinajolieae Bond, 2008 — USA
 A. anzaborrego Bond, 2012 — USA
 A. asmodaeus Bond, 2012 — USA
 A. atomarius Simon, 1891 (type) — USA
 A. barackobamai Bond, 2012 — USA
 A. bonoi Bond, 2012 — USA
 A. cabrillo Bond, 2012 — USA, Mexico
 A. cahuilla Bond, 2012 — USA
 A. cajalco Bond, 2012 — USA
 A. chavezi Bond, 2012 — USA
 A. chemehuevi Bond, 2012 — USA
 A. chiricahua Bond, 2012 — USA
 A. dantrippi Bond, 2012 — USA
 A. derhamgiulianii Bond, 2012 — USA
 A. dorothealangeae Bond, 2012 — USA
 A. edwardabbeyi Bond, 2012 — USA
 A. elisabethae Bond, 2012 — USA
 A. fisheri Bond, 2012 — USA
 A. fornax Bond, 2012 — USA
 A. hedinorum Bond, 2012 — USA
 A. hesperus (Chamberlin, 1919) — USA
 A. huntington Bond, 2012 — USA
 A. icenoglei Bond, 2012 — USA, Mexico
 A. isabella Bond, 2012 — USA
 A. killerdana Bond, 2012 — USA
 A. lucerne Bond, 2012 — USA
 A. mikeradtkei Bond, 2012 — USA
 A. miwok Bond, 2008 — USA
 A. muiri Bond, 2012 — USA
 A. nateevansi Bond, 2012 — USA
 A. pennjillettei Bond, 2012 — USA
 A. sabinae Valdez-Mondragón & Cortez-Roldán, 2016 — Mexico
 A. sarlacc Bond, 2012 — USA
 A. satleri Bond, 2012 — USA
 A. serrano Bond, 2012 — USA
 A. sierra Bond, 2012 — USA
 A. simus Chamberlin, 1917 — USA, Mexico
 A. sinnombre Bond, 2012 — USA
 A. stanfordianus Smith, 1908 — USA
 A. stephencolberti Bond, 2008 — USA

Cryptocteniza

Cryptocteniza Bond & Hamilton, 2020
 C. kawtak Bond & Hamilton, 2020 (type) — USA

Entychides

Entychides Simon, 1888
 E. arizonicus Gertsch & Wallace, 1936 — USA
 E. aurantiacus Simon, 1888 (type) — Mexico
 E. dugesi Simon, 1888 — Mexico
 E. guadalupensis Simon, 1888 — Guadeloupe

Eucteniza

Eucteniza Ausserer, 1875
 E. cabowabo Bond & Godwin, 2013 — Mexico
 E. caprica Bond & Godwin, 2013 — Mexico
 E. chichimeca Bond & Godwin, 2013 — Mexico
 E. coylei Bond & Godwin, 2013 — Mexico
 E. diablo Bond & Godwin, 2013 — Mexico
 E. golondrina Bond & Godwin, 2013 — Mexico
 E. hidalgo Bond & Godwin, 2013 — Mexico
 E. huasteca Bond & Godwin, 2013 — Mexico
 E. mexicana Ausserer, 1875 (type) — Mexico
 E. panchovillai Bond & Godwin, 2013 — Mexico
 E. relata (O. Pickard-Cambridge, 1895) — USA, Mexico
 E. ronnewtoni Bond & Godwin, 2013 — USA
 E. rosalia Bond & Godwin, 2013 — Mexico
 E. zapatista Bond & Godwin, 2013 — Mexico

Myrmekiaphila

Myrmekiaphila Atkinson, 1886
 M. comstocki Bishop & Crosby, 1926 — USA
 M. coreyi Bond & Platnick, 2007 — USA
 M. flavipes (Petrunkevitch, 1925) — USA
 M. fluviatilis (Hentz, 1850) — USA
 M. foliata Atkinson, 1886 (type) — USA
 M. howelli Bond & Platnick, 2007 — USA
 M. jenkinsi Bond & Platnick, 2007 — USA
 M. millerae Bond & Platnick, 2007 — USA
 M. minuta Bond & Platnick, 2007 — USA
 M. neilyoungi Bond & Platnick, 2007 — USA
 M. tigris Bond & Ray, 2012 — USA
 M. torreya Gertsch & Wallace, 1936 — USA

Neoapachella

Neoapachella Bond & Opell, 2002
 N. rothi Bond & Opell, 2002 (type) — USA

Promyrmekiaphila

Promyrmekiaphila Schenkel, 1950
 P. clathrata (Simon, 1891) (type) — USA
 P. winnemem Stockman & Bond, 2008 — USA

References

Euctenizidae